The 1980–81 Utah Jazz season was the team's seventh in the NBA. They began the season hoping to improve upon their 24–58 output from the previous season. The team started the season 12–6 but lost 15 of the next 17 games, however they bested it by four wins, finishing 28–54, but failed to qualify for the playoffs for the seventh straight season.

Draft picks

Roster

Regular season

Season standings

Notes
 z, y – division champions
 x – clinched playoff spot

Record vs. opponents

Game log

Player statistics

Awards and records
 Darrell Griffith, NBA Rookie of the Year Award
 Adrian Dantley, All-NBA Second Team
 Darrell Griffith, NBA All-Rookie Team 1st Team

Transactions

Free Agents

References

Utah Jazz seasons
U
Utah Jazz
Utah Jazz